Michael Sladek (born 1946 in Murrhardt) is a German doctor and bearer of the Federal Cross of Merit.

Life 
He became famous by realising a grid-independent system for producing electricity, by distributed little power plants. 
For this he was awarded 1996 by the German magazine Capital  with the Capital/ WWF - Umweltpreis. In 1999 he and his wife Ursula Sladek were awarded with the Nuclear-Free Future Award. In January 2004, the Sladek couple was awarded the highest order in Germany, the Federal Cross of Merit, for their great engagement for the environment.

After the Chernobyl catastrophe in 1986, he became known for his idea of a system independent of nuclear power plants for generating electric power through distributed mini power plants. With his system that combines an efficiency-strategy with a power saving strategy it became possible to satisfy the power consumption of the community Schönau in the Black-Forest. 
Following his engagement supported by his wife and many friends the first German green power-provider came into existence, the EWS Schönau.
The community of Schönau was the first community on Earth in a Western civilised country that became independent of the national power grid and could decide how the power will be produced.

Honors 

 2004: Federal Cross of Merit on ribbon, together with his wife
2007: German Founder Award
2012: Order of Merit of the State of Baden-Württemberg, together with his wife

See also 
Green power

References

1946 births
Living people
Physicians from Baden-Württemberg
German environmentalists
Recipients of the Cross of the Order of Merit of the Federal Republic of Germany
Recipients of the Order of Merit of Baden-Württemberg